This list of University of Zimbabwe people includes notable alumni, professors, and administrators associated with the University of Zimbabwe, formerly the University of Rhodesia.

Alumni

Academia 

 Douglas B. Allen, professor and MBA director at the University of Denver
 Kathleen Coleman (1975), classicist and professor at Harvard University
 John McDowell, South African philosopher and professor at the University of Pittsburgh
 Peter McLaughlin, Northern Irish-Zimbabwean educator, historian, and school administrator
 Levi Nyagura, mathematician; Vice Chancellor of the University of Zimbabwe since 2003

Business and finance 

 Gideon Gono, banker; Governor of the Reserve Bank of Zimbabwe 2003–2013
 David Hatendi (1976), businessman and banker; Zimbabwe's first black Rhodes Scholar
 Paul Tangi Mhova Mkondo, businessman, political activist, and commercial farmer
 Blessing Mudavanhu, businessman, banker, and corporate executive

Entertainment 

 Lucian Msamati (1997), British-Tanzanian actor
 Xoliswa Sithole (1987), Zimbabwean-South African actress and documentary filmmaker

Government, law, and politics

Political officeholders 

 Michael Lulume Bayigga (2004), Ugandan physician and Member of Parliament
 Tendai Biti (1990), lawyer and Member of Parliament; Minister of Finance 2009–2013
 Nelson Chamisa, lawyer and Member of Parliament; Minister of Information and Communications Technology 2009–2013
 Fortune Chasi, lawyer and Member of Parliament
 Fay Chung (1968), educator and politician; Minister of Education, Sport and Culture 1988–1993
 Lord Robert Hayward; British politician and Member of Parliament 1983–1992
 Rebecca Kadaga (2000, 2003); Ugandan politician and Member of Parliament; Speaker of the Ugandan Parliament since 2011
 David Karimanzira (1973); educator and politician; Minister of Youth, Sport and Culture 1985–1987; Minister of Lands, Agriculture and Rural Settlement 1987–1990; Minister of Higher Education and Technology 1990–1993; Minister of Information, Post and Telecommunications 1993–1997; Governor of Mashonaland East Province 1997–2006; Governor of Harare Province 2006–2011
 Jessie Majome (1995, 2008), lawyer and Member of Parliament
 Witness Mangwende, politician; Minister of Foreign Affairs 1981–1987; Ministry of Information, Posts, and Telecommunications 1987–1991; Minister of Lands, Agriculture, and Rural Resettlement 1991–1994; Minister of Education and Culture 1995–2002; Minister of Transport and Communication 2002–2004; Governor of Harare Province 2004–2005
 Oppah Muchinguri, politician; Member of Parliament until 2008; Minister of Women's Affairs, Gender and Community Development 2005-2009; Minister of Higher and Tertiary Education and Science and Technology Development 2014-2015; Minister of Environment, Water and Climate since 2015
 Arthur Mutambara (1990), politician and founder of the Movement for Democratic Change – Mutambara party; Deputy Prime Minister of Zimbabwe 2009–2013
 Benon Mutambi, economist and civil servant, Permanent Secretary of the Ugandan Ministry of Internal Affairs since 2016
 Christopher Mutsvangwa (attended), businessman, diplomat, and politician; Zimbabwean Ambassador to China 2002–2006; Member of Parliament 2013–2016; Minister for War Veterans 2014–2016; Chairman of the Zimbabwe National Liberation War Veterans Association since 2014; Minister of Media, Information, and Broadcast Services since 2017
 Welshman Ncube, lawyer, businessman, professor, and politician; Minister of Industry and Commerce 2009–2013
 Sophia Simba, Tanzanian politician and Member of Parliament; Minister of Community Development, Gender and Children 2006–2008 and 2010–2015
 Lulama Xingwana, South African politician; Member of Parliament since 1994; Minister of Agriculture and Land Affairs 2006–2009; Minister of Arts and Culture 2009–2010; Minister for Women, Children and Persons with Disabilities 2010–2014
 Patrick Zhuwao; politician, businessman, and farmer; Member of Parliament 2008-2013; Minister of Youth Development, Indigenisation and Economic Empowerment 2015-2017; Minister of Public Service, Labour and Social Welfare 2017

Diplomats 

 Boniface Chidyausiku, diplomat; Zimbabwean ambassador to China and North Korea (1990–1996), Angola (1996–1999), the World Trade Organization (1999–2002), the United Nations (1999–2010), and Russia (2011–2015)
 Julian Harston, British diplomat for Her Majesty's Diplomatic Service and the United Nations
 Tichaona Jokonya, politician and diplomat; Zimbabwean Ambassador to Ethiopia 1983–1988; Minister of Information 2005–2006
 Mike Nicholas Sango, Zimbabwe National Army brigadier general and diplomat; Zimbabwean Ambassador to Russia since 2015
 Trudy Stevenson; politician and diplomat; founding member of the Movement for Democratic Change; Member of Parliament 2000–2008; Zimbabwean ambassador to Senegal and The Gambia since 2009

Lawyers and judges 

Ishmael Chatikobo (1979), former justice of the High Court of Zimbabwe
George Chikumbirike (1979), prominent Harare lawyer
Moses Chinhengo (1979), former justice of the High Court of Zimbabwe
 George Chiweshe (1988), Zimbabwe National Army brigadier general; chairman of the Zimbabwe Electoral Commission
Anne-Marie Gowora (1979), justice of the Supreme Court of Zimbabwe since 2012; justice of the High Court of Zimbabwe 2000–2012
 Steven W. Hawkins (1985), American lawyer; former director of the NAACP and Amnesty International
 Irene Mulyagonja, Ugandan lawyer and judge; justice of the High Court of Uganda 2008–2012; Inspector General of the Government since 2012
 Simpson Mutambanengwe (1959), Zimbabwean-Namibian lawyer and judge; justice of the High Court of Zimbabwe 1986–1994; Justice of the High Court of Namibia 1994–?; he also served on the Supreme Court of Namibia; acting Chief Justice of Namibia 2004; Chairman of the Zimbabwe Electoral Commission 2010–2013
 Tawanda Mutasah, lawyer and senior director of law and policy at Amnesty International
 Mkhululi Nyathi (1999) lawyer and former member of the Zimbabwe Electoral Commission
 Bharat Patel (1975), acting Attorney General of Zimbabwe 2003 and 2007–2008; Justice of the High Court of Zimbabwe 2005–2013; Justice of the Supreme Court of Zimbabwe since 2013
Jacqueline Pratt (1979), former Harare magistrate
 Vusi Pikoli (1988), South African lawyer; Director of the National Prosecuting Authority 2005–2007
 Shafimana Ueitele (1990), Namibian lawyer and judge; former Electoral Commissioner of Namibia and Justice of the High Court of Namibia

Activists and political figures 

 Sarah Kachingwe (1961), politician and activist; first black female to enroll at the then-University College of Rhodesia in 1957
 Lovemore Madhuku (1990), lawyer and democracy activist
 Alex Magaisa (1997), lawyer and former advisor to Prime Minister Morgan Tsvangirai; lecturer at the University of Kent
 Fadzayi Mahere (2008), lawyer and political activist
 Betty Makoni, educator and female sexual abuse victims' activist
 Janice McLaughlin (1992), nun, missionary, human rights activist
 Diana Mitchell, writer and political activist
 Daniel Molokele (1999), lawyer and democracy activist
 Earnest Mudzengi (2001), human rights and democracy activist
 Everjoice Win (1988), feminist activist
 Beauty Zhuwao, politician; former Mashonaland West provincial treasurer for ZANU–PF
 Brilliant Sigabade Mhlanga, (2001) (2002), Former Secretary General of the SRC UZ, NCA - National Human Rights Chair, Prominent Activist from Matebeleland and Pro-Mthwakazi Activist, Senior Lecturer  at the University of Hertfordshire

Journalism and media 

 Michael Holman (1968), journalist and novelist; Africa editor for the Financial Times
 Julian Marshall, British journalist and radio broadcaster for the BBC World Service
 Trevor Ncube, businessman and newspaper publisher

Literature 

 Catherine Buckle (1979), farmer and writer
 Shimmer Chinodya, novelist
 Chirikure Chirikure, poet, writer, and musician
 Tsitsi Dangarembga, novelist and filmmaker
 Petina Gappah, lawyer, writer, and novelist
 Chenjerai Hove, poet, novelist, and essayist
 Alexander Kanengoni, writer
 Dambudzo Marechera, novelist, playwright, poet, and short story writer
 Albert Nyathi, poet
 Len Rix, translator of Hungarian literature
 Irene Sabatini, novelist
 Elinor Sisulu, Zimbabwean-South African writer and activist

Medicine, science, and technology 

 Sir Michael Berridge, British physiologist and biochemist
Charles Changunda, chemist and HIV/AIDS researcher 
 Pride Chigwedere, physician and HIV/AIDS researcher
 Rachel Chikwamba, biopharmaceutical researcher
 Solomon Guramatunhu, ophthalmologist
Milton Simbarashe Kambarami, Biochemist, Bioinformaticist and Evolutionary Virologist notable for his work in SARS CoV 2  (COVID19) Research
 Steven Hatfill (1984), American physician, virologist, and biological weapons researcher
 Jonathan Hutton (1984), British-Zimbabwean ecologist and conservationist; professor at the University of Kent
 Tonderai Kasu, Substantive Director of Health and Environmental Services for Chitungwiza and Former Acting Town Clerk (Acting Chief Executive) for Chitungwiza Town Council
Elizabeth Mambo, biochemist and cancer researcher 
Collen Masimirembwa, biochemist, founder and professor (African Institute of Biomedical Science and Technology)
 Bothwell Mbuwayesango, pediatric surgeon who successfully separated conjoined twins in 2014
Victor Moyo, physician and cancer researcher 
 Francisca Mutapi, parasite immunologist and the first black female professor at the University of Edinburgh
 Madeline Nyamwanza-Makonese (1970), physician and first female doctor in Zimbabwe

Music 
 Viomak, musician and political activist

Religion 

 Albert Chama, Zambian Anglican bishop; Archbishop of Central Africa since 2011
 Rob Nairn, South African lawyer and Tibetan Buddhist teacher and author

Sports

Visual arts 

 Rashid Lombard, South African photographer and photojournalist

Other 

 Maud Chifamba, youngest university student in Africa at age 14, award-winning activist and speaker

Faculty

Academia

Principals of the University of Zimbabwe 

 William Rollo, interim Principal 1953–1955
 Walter Adams, Principal 1955–1967
 Terence Miller, Principal 1967–1969
 Robert Craig Principal 1969–1980
 Leonard Lewis, Principal 1980–1981
 Walter Kamba, Vice-Chancellor 1981–1992
 Gordon Chavunduka, Vice-Chancellor 1992–1996
 Graham Hill, Vice-Chancellor 1997–2002
 Levi Nyagura, Vice-Chancellor 2003–

University heads 
A number of former University of Zimbabwe faculty and administrators have gone on to head other universities:

 Sir Walter Adams, Director of the London School of Economics
 Ngwabi Bhebhe, Vice-Chancellor of Midlands State University
 Cowdeng Chikomba, Vice-Chancellor of Bindura University of Science Education
 Peter Dzvimbo, Vice-Chancellor of Zimbabwe Open University and Rector of the African Virtual University
 Phineas Makhurane, Vice-Chancellor of the National University of Science and Technology
 Lindela Ndlovu, Vice-Chancellor of the National University of Science and Technology
 Emmanuel Ngara, Pro-Vice-Chancellor of the University of Fort Hare and Pro-Vice-Chancellor of the University of KwaZulu-Natal
 Charles Nherera, Vice-Chancellor of Chinhoyi University of Technology
 David Simbi, Vice-Chancellor of Chinhoyi University of Technology
 Julius Weinberg, Vice-Chancellor of Kingston University
 Tawana Kupe, Vice-Chancellor of University of Pretoria

Educators and school administrators 

 Ezra Chitando, Zimbabwean academic; lecturer in  History
 Peter McLaughlin, Northern Irish historian and school administrator; lecturer in modern history at UZ 1977–1983

Government, law, and politics

Political officeholders 

 Canaan Banana, Methodist minister and politician, President of Zimbabwe 1980–1987; chair of the religion department at UZ in the 1980s
 Ignatius Chombo, politician and businessman; Minister of Local Government 2000–2015; Minister of Home Affairs 2015–2017; Minister of Finance 2017; lecturer and department chair at UZ 1988–1992
 Heneri Dzinotyiweyi, mathematician and Member of Parliament; Minister of Science and Technology Development since 2009; former dean of science at UZ
 Munyaradzi Gwisai, Socialist and political activist; former Member of Parliament
 Owen Horwood, South African economist and politician; South African Minister of Finance 1975–1984; taught economics at UZ in the late 1950s
 Jonathan Moyo, politician; Minister of Information 2000–2005, 2013–2015; Member of Parliament 2005–2013; Minister of Higher and Tertiary Education, Science and Technology Development 2015–2017; was a lecturer at UZ in the Department of Political and Administrative Studies 1988–1993
 Elphas Mukonoweshuro, political scientist and politician; Minister of Public Service 2009–2011; taught political science at UZ
 Welshman Ncube, lawyer, businessman, and politician; Minister of Industry and Commerce 2009–2013; taught law at UZ 1985–2000; chair of the Department of Private Law at UZ 1988–1996
 Malcolm Rifkind, British lawyer and politician; Member of Parliament 1974–2015; British Foreign Secretary 1995–1997; was an assistant lecturer at UZ 1967–1968.

Lawyers and judges 

 Anne Hellum, Norwegian jurist and professor at the University of Oslo Faculty of Law; visiting professor of law at UZ since 1989
 Ben Hlatwayo, Justice of the High Court of Zimbabwe
 Lovemore Madhuku, lawyer and democracy activist; previously taught law at UZ
 Rita Makarau, Justice and President of the High Court of Zimbabwe
 Mkhululi Nyathi, lawyer and former member of the Zimbabwe Electoral Commission; taught public law at UZ 2002–2004

Activists and political figures 

 Panashe Eric Chivenge, political activist; Chairman of the National Constitutional Assembly

Humanities 

 Giovanni Arrighi, Italian economist and sociologist; professor at Johns Hopkins University
 David Beach, British-Zimbabwean historian
 Korkut Boratav, Turkish Marxian economist; taught at UZ 1984–1986
Ernest Bulle, academic and politician; taught African languages at UZ in the 1970s
 Jackson Mutero Chirenje, historian and former professor at Harvard University; former lecturer and chair of the history department at UZ
 Peter Garlake, archaeologist and historian; professor at UZ 1964–1970; forced to leave Rhodesia in 1970 due to his research concluding that Great Zimbabwe was built by the Shona people
 Shadrack Gutto, Chair of African Renaissance Studies at  the University of South Africa; taught at UZ until he was deported from Zimbabwe in 1988.
Ioan Lewis, Scottish anthropologist and historian; taught at UZ in the 1960s
 John McCracken, Scottish historian; taught at UZ 1964–1965, when he left following Rhodesia's UDI
 Diana Mitchell, political activist and writer; taught science at UZ
Brian Raftopoulos, historian and former professor of Development Studies at UZ
 Terence Ranger, British historian; taught history at UZ 1957–1963 when he was deported from Rhodesia for his views on African history that the government considered radical
 Barrie Pettman, businessman, academic, and philanthropist; was director of the manpower unit at UZ 1978–1979

Literature 

 Charles Mungoshi, novelist and short story writer; writer-in-residence at UZ 1982–1985
 Solomon Mutswairo, novelist and poet; wrote the lyrics to the National Anthem of Zimbabwe; former writer-in-residence at UZ
 Len Rix, translator of Hungarian literature; taught English at UZ
 Clive Wake, South African editor and translator of modern French and African literature
 Musaemura Zimunya; writer and poet; professor of English at UZ since 1980

Medicine, science, and technology 

 Gordon Chavunduka, sociologist and traditional African medicine advocate; former President of the Zimbabwe National Traditional Healers Association; Vice-Chancellor of UZ 1992–1996
 Christopher Chetsanga, biochemist; taught at UZ 1983–2017; dean of science 1986–1991; Pro-Vice-Chancellor 1991–1993
 Innocent Gangaidzo, academic and gastroenterologist, who currently serves as the president of the East, Central, and Southern Africa College of Physicians (ESCACOP).
 Michael Gelfand, South African-Zimbabwean physician; professor of African Medicine at UZ 1962–1970; professor and head of the department of medicine 1970–1977
 James Gita Hakim, professor of medicine, cardiologist and HIV clinical trialist
 Graham Hill, veterinary surgeon and researcher; Vice-Chancellor of UZ 1997–2002
 Laurence Levy, first neurosurgeon in Africa; professor of surgery and anatomy at UZ
 Terence Miller, British geologist; Principal of UZ 1967–1969
 Louis Miles Muggleton, South African-British physicist and electrical engineer; founder, professor, and dean of the Faculty of Engineering at UZ 1973–1980
 Brian Walker, Zimbabwean-Australian ecologist; was a lecturer at UZ 1969–1975

Religion 

 Robert Craig; Scottish Presbyterian minister and theologian; former Moderator of the General Assembly of the Church of Scotland; Principal of UZ 1969–1980
 Adrian Hastings, Malaysian-British Roman Catholic priest, historian, and writer; professor of religious studies at UZ 1982–1985
 Rob Nairn, South African lawyer and Tibetan Buddhist teacher and author; taught law and criminology at UZ

References 

University of Zimbabwe